Bridgewater is a New Jersey Transit railroad station on the Raritan Valley Line, in Bridgewater, New Jersey. The station stands on the site of the former Calco station that served American Cyanamid prior to its closure.

History
The station was reconstructed in 1999 in conjunction with the construction of TD Bank Ballpark, and the ballpark's White Lot is used for station parking. Ticket vending machines were installed on the inbound platform in June 2011.

Bridgewater station is the slated terminus for the proposed restored West Trenton Line service. West Trenton trains will run southwest from here to the West Trenton SEPTA station in Ewing, and continue east along the Raritan Valley Line to its terminus at Penn Station in Newark.

Station layout
The station has two low-level side platforms that can platform two cars, and is not compliant with the Americans with Disabilities Act of 1990. On the eastbound side there is a station house that contains some benches, maps, and heaters.

References

External links

WLABT Commuter Parking lot website

world.nycsubway.org - NJT Raritan Line

NJ Transit Rail Operations stations
Railway stations in Somerset County, New Jersey